Rigidoporus laetus is a species of polypore fungus in the family Meripilaceae. It was originally described in 1883 as Polyporus laetus by Mordecai Cubitt Cooke. Peter Buchanan and Leif Ryvarden transferred it to Rigidoporus in 1988. Found in south Australia, the fungus is a plant pathogen that causes white rot in Eucalyptus.

References

Fungi described in 1883
Fungi of Australia
Meripilaceae
Fungal plant pathogens and diseases
Taxa named by Mordecai Cubitt Cooke